Zlatne žice Slavonije is a music festival for both tambura and pop music held annually in Požega, Croatia. The modern festival has been held annually since 1990.

The first music festival in Požega began in 1969 and was held annually until 1981.

Tambura winners
2005 - Slavonske lole for Ti si moje najmilije

Pop music winners
2005 - Miroslav Škoro for Golubica

References

External links
Official site

Music festivals in Croatia
Tourist attractions in Požega-Slavonia County
Požega, Croatia
Music festivals in Yugoslavia